Jack Mapanje (born 25 March 1944) is a Malawian writer and poet.  He was the head of English at the Chancellor College, the main campus of the University of Malawi before being imprisoned in 1987 for his collection Of Chameleons and Gods, which indirectly criticized the administration of President Hastings Banda. He was released in 1991 and emigrated to the UK, where he worked as a teacher.

Background
The child of Nyanja  and Yao parents, John Alfred Clement ("Jack") Mapanje was born in Kadango Village, Mangochi District, Malawi. He received his BA in education from the University of London and worked for a time as a lecturer in Malawi before returning to the UK to study linguistics at University College, London in the early 1980s.

He subsequently became head of the Department of Language and Linguistics at the University of Malawi.

Imprisonment
During the rule of President Hastings Banda, Mapanje was jailed without charge in 1987, apparently for publishing his poem collection Of Chameleons and Gods. The collection obliquely criticized Banda's government, and the "chameleon" of the title refers to the disguise of personal voice Mapanje deemed necessary in order to mount a criticism of the politics at the time. The book received no official ban, but was "withdrawn from circulation". Amnesty International declared him a prisoner of conscience and campaigned for his release. Its protests included a reading of selections from Of Chameleons and Gods outside the Malawian High Commission in London by UK Nobel laureate Harold Pinter. Mapanje was also awarded the 1990 PEN/Barbara Goldsmith Freedom to Write Award during his imprisonment, which carried a US$3,000 cash award. PEN's president, US novelist Larry McMurtry, stated that "the point [of the award] is to generate enough heat so Mapanje gets out of jail". Nigerian Nobel laureate Wole Soyinka and UK playwright Ronald Harwood also campaigned for his release.

Mapanje was held for three-and-a-half years before being released in 1991. After his release, he was told he needed to reapply for his previous professorship at the University of Malawi. After a lengthy delay in his application, he instead emigrated to the UK. He wrote a memoir about the experience, And Crocodiles Are Hungry At Night, which was also adapted into a play.

Exile
After arriving in the UK, Mapanje was awarded a fellowship at The University of York. He later became a visiting professor at Leeds University. He also taught creative writing in prisons.

In 1994, he returned to Malawi with BBC2 to make a documentary.

Chameleon politics
He is credited for applying the term "chameleon politics" to describe a political environment where politicians switch parties and forge alliances without transparency or notice in rapidly changing political environments where party switching, floor crossing, and coalition formations are rampant. The notion is described in his 1981 book, Of Chameleons and Gods.

Works
 Of Chameleons and Gods, 1981
 On the Interpretation of Aspect and Tense in Chiyao, Chicheŵa, and English. University College London Ph.D. thesis, 1983
 The Chattering Wagtails of Mikuyu Prison, 1993
 The Last of the Sweet Bananas: New and Selected Poems, 2004
 The Beasts of Nalunga, 2007
 And Crocodiles are Hungry at Night – a memoir. Ayebia Clarke Publishing, 2011

Awards
 1988   Rotterdam Poetry International Award 
 1990 PEN/Barbara Goldsmith Freedom to Write Award
 2002   African Literature Association (USA) Fonlon-Nichols Award

References

Relevant literature
 'Dunmade, 'Femi. 2019. A Phenomenology of Selected Postproverbial Poetry of Jack Mapanje. Matatu 51:417-431.

External links

'Orality and the Memory of Justice' by Jack Mapanje, given in 1995 as the first annual African Studies Lecture at the University of Leeds.
Jack Mapanje on Desert Island Discs, BBC, October 2004
"John Alfred Clement Mapanje: On the Interpretation of Aspect and Tense in Chiyao, Chichewa, and English". University College London PhD Thesis (1983).

Miscellaneous
  Links to audio recording Angus Calder reading his work, Scrubbing the Furious Walls of Mikuyu with music by Dmytro Morykit

1944 births
Amnesty International prisoners of conscience held by Malawi
Living people
Malawian poets
Alumni of the University of London
Academics of Newcastle University
Academic staff of the University of Malawi
Malawian exiles
Malawian emigrants to the United Kingdom
20th-century male writers
21st-century male writers
Chewa-language writers
Linguists of Chewa